Abdi Hassan Buni or Abdi Hassan Buuni was a Somali Politician, Minister under the British Somaliland Protectorate and was the first Deputy Prime Minister of the Somali Republic.  He was part of the USP, the United Somali Party, a British Somaliland Protectorate political party.

History 
Abdi Hassan Buni hails from the Awdal region of Somalia and belongs to the Xeebjire, Habr 'Affan (Habar Cafaan) Gadabursi (Gadabuursi) clan. He was one of the ministers selected of the United Somali Party to become Deputy Prime Minister in the Aden Abdulle administration of the newly formed Somali Republic at that time, a unification between two territories Somaliland British Protectorate and UN Somali Trustee (Somalia Italiana).

In 1964 Buni was re-elected to the parliament of the Somali Republic. In 1969 he became the head of the Golweyn Banana Project in Lower Shabelle. Buni served as CEO of Agricultural Equipment Manufacturing Company (AITCO) from 1982 to 1984. After the military coup in Somalia, Buni retired from politics. In the aftermath of the collapse of the Somali Republic he was involved in peacebuilding activities. He served as chairman of the Somaliland Peacebuilding Commission from 1995 to 1997.

In 2002 Abdi Hassan Buni made a return to politics and became part of the first government formed by President Dahir Riyale Kahin. Buni served as Minister of Council Relations of Somaliland from 2003 until his death in 2009.

Buni was a successful entrepreneur and owned the Buni Hotel on the outskirts of Mogadishu as well as the famous Harawo Hotel in Borama, which was built in 1962.

Abdi Hassan Buni died in London in 2009.

Education 
 Elementary School Borama (1946-1948)
 Intermediate School Sheikh (1949–1950)
 Administration and Management in Addis Ababa, Yemen (1953) 
 V.T.C Amoud (Correspondence Course) (1954–1955 )

Career 
 Deputy Prime Minister (1960)
 Re-elected to the Parliament of the Somali Republic (1964)
 CEO of Agricultural Equipment Manufacturing Company (AITCO) (1982-1984)
 Head of the fishing company (AFCO) (1985-1997)
 Chairman of the Somaliland Peacebuilding Commission (1995-1997)
 Minister of Council Relations Republic of Somaliland (2003-2009)

References 

British Somaliland people of World War II
Somalian politicians
Gadabuursi
People from Awdal
2009 deaths